Derek Clive Jackman (20 August 1927 — 21 November 2017) was an English footballer who played as a wing half.

Career
Born in Colchester, Jackman began his career with Essex club Chelmsford City. In 1945, Jackman signed for Crystal Palace. During his time at the club, Jackman failed to make a senior appearance.

On 11 August 1948, Jackman joined Second Division club West Ham United. On 21 August 1948, Jackman made a goalscoring debut for West Ham 'A' in an Eastern Counties League fixture away to Harwich & Parkeston. Two days later, Jackman moved up to West Ham's reserve side, making another goalscoring debut in a 4–1 victory against Ipswich Town reserves. On 5 March 1949, after becoming a regular for the reserves, Jackman made his Football League debut for the club in a 2–1 win against Blackburn Rovers at the Boleyn Ground. Jackman would go on to make seven more league appearances for West Ham, before re-signing for Chelmsford City in July 1951 for £1,000.

References

1927 births
2017 deaths
Association football midfielders
Association football forwards
English footballers
Sportspeople from Colchester
Chelmsford City F.C. players
Crystal Palace F.C. players
West Ham United F.C. players
English Football League players